The Archdiocese of Detroit is a Latin Church ecclesiastical territory or archdiocese of the  Catholic Church covering the Michigan counties of Lapeer, Macomb, Monroe, Oakland, St. Clair, and Wayne.  It is the metropolitan archdiocese of the Ecclesiastical Province of Detroit, which includes all dioceses in the state of Michigan.  In addition, in 2000 the archdiocese accepted pastoral responsibility for the Catholic Church in the Cayman Islands, which consists of Saint Ignatius Parish on Grand Cayman (the Archdiocese of Kingston maintains a mission sui iuris jurisdiction over the Cayman Islands).

Established as the Diocese of Detroit on March 8, 1833, it was elevated to archiepiscopal status on May 22, 1937. Ste. Anne's in Detroit is the second oldest continuously-operating Catholic parish in the United States dating from July 26, 1701; it now serves a large Hispanic congregation.

The Cathedral of the Most Blessed Sacrament, located at 9844 Woodward Avenue, in Detroit has served as the mother church since 1938. Earlier cathedrals were: Ste. Anne de Detroit, 1833 to 1848; Sts. Peter and Paul Church, 1848 to 1877; 1877 to 1890, St. Aloysius (as pro-cathedral), 1890 to 1938, St. Patrick's Church at 124 Adelaide Street.

History

Before the Diocese of Detroit was formed, Michigan had been under the ecclesiastical jurisdiction of the Diocese of Quebec from 1701 until sometime after 1796; de facto American sovereignty was established in that year. At the time, the Diocese of Baltimore encompassed the whole of the United States. Upon the creation of diocesan seats at Bardstown (1808) and later, at Cincinnati (1821), Detroit and Michigan were assigned to those sees.

Pope Gregory XVI formed the Diocese of Detroit March 8, 1833, and named Frederick Rese as its first bishop.  At the time it covered Michigan, Wisconsin, Minnesota and the Dakotas to the Missouri River. In 1843, all territory of the diocese not incorporated into the State of Michigan was transferred to the Diocese of Milwaukee.

On July 29, 1853, Pope Pius IX formed the Vicarate Apostolic of Upper Michigan, with responsibility for the Upper Peninsula. The territory of the diocese would be further reduced to its current size by the organization of the dioceses of Grand Rapids (1882), Lansing (1937), and shortly after the see was elevated to the status of an archdiocese, Saginaw (1938).

The son of Prussian Polish immigrants, Rev. John A. Lemke, born in Detroit on February 10, 1866, was the first native-born Roman Catholic priest of Polish descent to be ordained in America.  He was baptized at St. Mary Roman Catholic Church (1843), at the corner of St. Antoine and Croghan (Monroe Street), on February 18, 1866, attended St. Albertus for his primary education, and studied at Detroit College (now the University of Detroit Mercy), where he received a bachelor's degree in 1884. After attending St. Mary's in Baltimore, he completed his theological studies at St. Francis Seminary in Monroe, Michigan, and he was ordained by Bishop John Samuel Foley in 1889. His added confirmation name was Aloysius.

In January 1989, Cardinal Edmund Szoka implemented a controversial plan to close 30 churches within the city of Detroit.  He also ordered 25 other parishes to improve their situation or also face closure.  The plan resulted from a five-year study which analyzed maintenance costs, priest availability, parish income and membership before recommending closure of 43 parishes.

The Associationa of Religion Data Archives indicated a Catholic membership in the archdiocese of 907,605.

On May 5, 2011, Archbishop Allen Vigneron announced that Pope Benedict XVI approved his request to name Saint Anne as patroness of Detroit.  The Papal decree stated that Saint Anne has been the city's patroness since time immemorial.

On February 21, 2012, Vigneron announced a second plan to consolidate churches to address declining membership and clergy availability within the archdiocese.  Under the plan, two parishes would close in 2012 and 60 others were to consolidate into 21 by the end of 2013. Six additional parishes were asked to submit a viable plan to repay debt or merge with other churches and the remaining 214 parishes in the archdiocese were asked to submit plans by the end of 2012 to share resources or merge.

On June 3, 2017, the archdiocese adopted a new coat of arms featuring the archdiocesan patroness St. Anne, three stars representing the Trinity, a door representing Blessed Solanus Casey of Detroit, and waves representing the Great Lakes. It replaced a coat of arms featuring antlers and martlets that was adopted upon the diocese's elevation to an archdiocese in 1937.

In 2014, the Archdiocese of Detroit began a missionary transformation with a Year of Prayer. During 2016, listening sessions were held at every parish to learn how the faithful felt the Archdiocese of Detroit could move from maintenance to mission. In November 2016, Archbishop Vigneron led a Synod during which over 400 participants – clergy, religious and laity – gathered to pray, share and discern a plan to renew the Church in Detroit.

The fruit of those efforts was Archbishop Vigneron’s pastoral letter, Unleash the Gospel, released on the Feast of Pentecost 2017. In this letter, Archbishop gave the roadmap for the missionary transformation of the Archdiocese of Detroit. This foundational document is the repository of the graces of Synod 16 that allows the work of the movement to unleash the Gospel to move forward with confidence, focus and resolve.

Response to Clergy Sexual Abuse Crisis 
The Archdiocese of Detroit first implemented its Policy on the Sexual Abuse of Minors by Clergy in 1988. The current, revised policy takes into consideration events and experiences of the past 30+ years, including The Charter for the Protection of Children and Young People (the Dallas Charter), which was enacted in 2002 by the United States Conference of Catholic Bishops (USCCB).

The Archdiocese of Detroit fully complies with the provisions of the Dallas Charter, including restricting the ministry of any priest against whom there is a “credible allegation” of the sexual abuse of a minor or vulnerable person, and the permanent removal from ministry of any priest subsequent to a determination of clerical sexual abuse by a canonical (Church law) process. Like all other U.S. dioceses, the Archdiocese of Detroit is subject to an independent compliance audit annually.

Another key provision of the Charter involves safe-environment training for all clerics serving in the Archdiocese of Detroit (including those who incardinate/transfer here or are in the area under different circumstances – e.g., as a student – and want to serve publicly in priestly ministry); priest candidates at Sacred Heart Major Seminary; as well as lay personnel, volunteers and students. Tens of thousands of individuals have been trained in the Archdiocese of Detroit over the past 17 years.

In 2002, a newly constituted Review Board was established to consider all reports of abuse and to advise the Archbishop. The Board is led by a retired Michigan Appeals Court Judge who was key in the drafting and adoption of the state’s first Victim’s Rights Act. Other individuals currently serving on the board include a retired prosecutor who established and led Wayne County’s first dedicated child abuse unit; a child psychologist; a health care executive; a former superintendent of Catholic schools; and an archdiocesan pastor.

Pursuant to a 2002 agreement with the six Michigan county prosecutors within the Archdiocese of Detroit, every complaint received by the Archdiocese of Detroit is immediately turned over to civil authorities, regardless of its source or when the alleged abuse took place. No complaints are held back, pre-screened or disregarded. The Archdiocese fully cooperates with law enforcement.

Similarly, every complaint is considered by the Review Board. Regardless of what finding or course of action civil authorities may pursue, if a complaint is found by the Review Board to be credible, the priest or deacon is restricted from ministry pending further investigation and resolution of the matter. The Archdiocese considers a complaint to be credible if it has a “semblance of truth,” meaning the allegation seems to be neither manifestly false nor frivolous; it appears to be or could possibly be true. Complaints involving non-clerical personnel are processed pursuant to the Archdiocesan Code of Conduct. In 2019, a Vatican-mandated protocol was adopted in the United States for reporting allegations of sexual abuse by bishops.

In the Archdiocese of Detroit, no priest or deacon with a credible complaint against him is allowed to continue in active ministry during the time his case is under review by the Church or civil authorities. Those priests who are restricted and/or removed from ministry are monitored by a retired parole officer to ensure compliance with the strict limitations on their public ministry.

Bishops

Bishops of Detroit
 Frederick Rese (1833–1871)  - Peter Paul Lefevere (coadjutor bishop 1841–1869); died before succession
 Caspar Borgess (1871–1887)
 John Samuel Foley (1888–1918)
 Michael Gallagher (1918–1937)

Archbishops of Detroit
 Cardinal Edward Aloysius Mooney (1937–1958)
 Cardinal John Francis Dearden (1958–1980)
 Cardinal Edmund Casimir Szoka (1981–1990), appointed President of the Prefecture for the Economic Affairs of the Holy See and later President of the Pontifical Commission for Vatican City State and Governatorate of Vatican City State
 Cardinal Adam Joseph Maida (1990–2009)
 Allen Henry Vigneron (2009–present)

Current auxiliary bishops of Detroit
 Arturo Cepeda (2011–present)
 Gerard William Battersby (2016–present)
 Robert Joseph Fisher (2016–present)
 Paul Fitzpatrick Russell (2022-present), holds the title of Archbishop ad personam.

Former auxiliary bishops of Detroit
Edward D. Kelly (1910–1919), appointed Bishop of Grand Rapids
Joseph C. Plagens (1924–1935), appointed Bishop of Sault-Sainte Marie-Marquette
Stephen Stanislaus Woznicki (1937–1950), appointed Bishop of Saginaw
Allen James Babcock (1947–1954), appointed Bishop of Grand Rapids
Alexander M. Zaleski (1950–1964), appointed Coadjutor Bishop of Lansing and subsequently succeeded to that see
John Anthony Donovan (1954–1967), appointed Bishop of Toledo
Henry Edmund Donnelly (1954–1967)
Joseph M. Breitenbeck (1965–1969), appointed Bishop of Grand Rapids
Walter Joseph Schoenherr (1968–1995)
 Thomas Gumbleton (1968–2006)
Joseph Leopold Imesch (1973–1979), appointed Bishop of Joliet in Illinois
Arthur Henry Krawczak (1973–1982)
Dale Joseph Melczek (1982–1995), appointed Coadjutor Bishop of Gary, and subsequently succeeded to that see after collateral assignment as Apostolic Administrator of the Diocese of Gary (1992–1995)
Patrick R. Cooney (1982–1989), appointed Bishop of Gaylord
Moses Anderson, SSE (1982–2003)
Bernard Joseph Harrington (1993–1998), appointed Bishop of Winona
Kevin Michael Britt (1993–2002), appointed Coadjutor of Grand Rapids and subsequently succeeded to that see
John Clayton Nienstedt (1996–2001), appointed Bishop of New Ulm
Allen Henry Vigneron (1996-2003), appointed Coadjutor Bishop of Oakland and subsequently succeeded to that see; later appointed Archbishop of Detroit
Leonard Paul Blair (1999–2003), appointed Bishop of Toledo
Earl Boyea (2002–2008), appointed Bishop of Lansing
John M. Quinn (2003–2008), appointed Coadjutor Bishop of Winona and subsequently succeeded to that see
 Francis R. Reiss (2003–2015)
 Walter A. Hurley (2003–2005), appointed Bishop of Grand Rapids
Daniel E. Flores (2006–2009), appointed Bishop of Brownsville
Michael J. Byrnes (2011–2016), appointed Coadjutor Archbishop of Agana (Guam) and subsequently succeeded to that see
Donald Hanchon (2011–2023)

Other priests of this diocese who became bishops
Camillus Paul Maes, appointed Bishop of Covington in 1884
Francis Clement Kelley, appointed Bishop of Oklahoma City in 1924
William Francis Murphy, appointed Bishop of Saginaw in 1938
Kenneth Edward Untener, appointed Bishop of Saginaw in 1980
Alexander Joseph Brunett, appointed Bishop of Helena in 1994
Jeffrey Marc Monforton, appointed Bishop of Steubenville in 2012
Robert John McClory, appointed Bishop of Gary in 2019

Churches and regions

The Detroit Archdiocese is divided into four administrative regions: Central (City of Detroit); Northeast (including Macomb and St. Clair Counties), Northwest (including Oakland and Lapeer Counties), and South (including Monroe County, the Downriver area, and the cities of Dearborn, Livonia, and Plymouth). Each of the four regions is further divided into smaller administrative areas known as vicariates. A list of churches in each of these regions and vicariates is found at List of Roman Catholic churches in the Archdiocese of Detroit.

Schools

As of 2013 the Roman Catholic Archdiocese of Detroit had 96 schools with 30,000 students. As of 2013 there are four Catholic grade schools and three Catholic high schools in the City of Detroit, with all of them in the city's west side.

In the 1964-1965 school year, there were 360 schools operated by the archdiocese, with about 110 grade schools in Detroit, Hamtramck, and Highland Park and 55 high schools in those three cities. There were a total of 203,000 students in the Catholic schools. The Catholic school population has decreased due to the increase of charter schools, increasing tuition at Catholic schools, the small number of African-American Catholics, White Catholics moving to suburbs, and the decreased number of teaching nuns.

Universities and colleges
 Madonna University
 Marygrove College (closed in December 2019)
 Sacred Heart Major Seminary
 University of Detroit Mercy

Photo gallery

Suffragan sees

Diocese of Gaylord
Diocese of Grand Rapids
Diocese of Kalamazoo
Diocese of Lansing
Diocese of Marquette
Diocese of Saginaw

See also

 Catholic Church by country
 Catholic Church hierarchy
 Polish Cathedral style churches
 Religion in Metro Detroit
 List of the Catholic dioceses of the United States

Notes

References and further reading

External links

Roman Catholic Archdiocese of Detroit official site

Archdiocese of Detroit at http://www.catholic-hierarchy.org
"Letter from Kerala Catholic Association to Rev. Adam J. Maida, Archbishop of Detroit" in the South Asian American Digital Archive (SAADA)

 
Detroit

Detroit
Detroit
1833 establishments in Michigan Territory